The Shuanghuan Laifu (来福) or Shuanghuan Laiwang (来旺)  (Formerly known as Shuanghuan Jiaolian until 2002) is a MPV and panel van of the Chinese automobile manufacturer Shuanghuan.

Overview
Codenamed the HBJ6460, the van was originally called the Shuanghuan Jiaolian (later renamed to Laifu in 2002), with the front cab design heavily resembling a fifth generation 1992 Toyota Hilux. A facelift changed the model name to Shuanghuan Laiwang, with the front cab design heavily resembling a first generation Honda CR-V. The chassis of Shuanghuan Laiwang was designed based on the chassis of the fifth generation Toyota Hilux.

Engine and transmission

Prices before discontinuation of the Laibao Laiwang in 2003 ranges from 79,800 yuan to 93,800 yuan.

References

Vans
2000s cars
Cars of China
Rear-wheel-drive vehicles
Plagiarism controversies